The Rainbow Singer is Irish author Simon Kerr's first novel. It was first published in June 2002. Simon Kerr also writes under the pseudonym Chris Kerr.

 (hardcover)
 (paperback)

Notes

2002 Irish novels
2002 debut novels